Sports in Montreal have played a major role of the city's history. Montreal is best known for being home to the Montreal Canadiens of the National Hockey League, which are currently the city's only team in the Big Four sports leagues.

Other professional teams in Montreal include the Montreal Alouettes of the Canadian Football League and CF Montréal of Major League Soccer.

Montreal is also well known for hosting the annual Formula One Canadian Grand Prix.

In the past, Montreal has also hosted many world-renowned sporting events, namely the 1976 Summer Olympics. It was also home to the Montreal Expos of Major League Baseball from 1969 to the 2004 season.

Professional and amateur sports

Canadian football

The Montreal Alouettes of the CFL play at Molson Stadium and have been one of the most successful CFL teams of the new millennium in terms of division championships won and sellout crowds. The Alouettes have won 7 Grey Cup championships in their history, the latest ones having been won in 2009 and 2010.

Although university football has long been popular with Anglo Montrealers, who support the McGill Redbirds and Concordia Stingers, enthusiastic Francophone crowds also enjoy the Université de Montréal's Carabins.

Ice hockey
The development of modern ice hockey occurred in Montreal. The city is famous for its ice hockey-hungry fans. The Montreal Canadiens is one of the largest franchises in the NHL. Montreal was home to the Montreal Canadiennes, a women's professional ice hockey team that won the Clarkson Cup in 2009, 2011, 2012 and 2017 before the CWHL folded in 2019. The Laval Rocket of the American Hockey League play at Place Bell on the end of the Orange Line on the Montreal Metro.

Montreal's off-island suburb of Boisbriand is home to the Quebec Major Junior Hockey League's Blainville-Boisbriand Armada.

Soccer

The city's current soccer team is the CF Montréal (known as the Montreal Impact until 2021), who joined Major League Soccer in 2012, the top tier of the American Soccer Pyramid, and play home games at Saputo Stadium. Montreal's WSL affiliate, FC Montreal, play at the Complexe sportif Claude-Robillard. Also at the Centre Sportif Bois-de-Boulogne plays the Laval Comets of the W-League, the second tier of women's soccer in the United States and Canada.

Australian rules football

AFL Quebec is the governing body of Australian Rules Football in Quebec. Based primarily out of Montreal and surrounding areas, it includes both a Men's and a Women's League. AFL Quebec prides itself on been one of the fastest growing and best runs leagues in Canada and North America.

AFL Quebec Men's League consists of four clubs, the West Island Wooders, Laval Bombers, Montreal Demons, and Old Montreal Dockers while the newly expanded Women's League also consists of four clubs, the NDG Devils and the Plateau Eagles from Montreal and the Carleton Warriors and Rideau Shamrocks from Ottawa.

Like most leagues outside of Australia, AFL Quebec is a nine a side league in both the men and the women. This is for numerous reasons, including but not limited to local player development and field availability. AFL Quebec plays the vast majority of its regular and final series games at Vanier College.

The AFL Quebec Regular Season runs over nine rounds from mid-May until early September. This is followed by finals in mid to late September, with three rounds of finals for the men and two rounds of finals for the women's.

AFL Quebec has both representative Men's and Women's 18 a side teams. These teams are known as the Quebec Saints, Montreal Angels and Ottawa Lady Swans respectively. They compete against other 18 a side representative team across Canada and North America. Generally these games occur a handful number of times over a season either in one off games or more commonly at invitational tournament. Such a tournament is the AFL Quebec Women's Tournament held early May every year.

Boxing
Montreal has become one of the top boxing cities in the world, hosting the third most events in North America, only behind Atlantic City and Las Vegas. The city also currently has two world champions in Jean Pascal and Lucian Bute as well as a number of top contenders such as Herman Ngoudjo, Joachim Alcine, Adrian Diaconu and Sebastian Demers.

Baseball

From 1897 to 1917 and from 1928 to 1960, Montreal fielded a minor league team, the Montreal Royals, most famous for having Jackie Robinson as a player for the 1946 season.

Montreal was the home of a major league baseball team, the Montreal Expos, named after the 1967 World's Fair, and began playing in the National League from 1969. On July 13, 1982, Montreal hosted the first Major League Baseball All-Star Game outside the United States. However, due to low attendance and other financial factors, the team moved to Washington, D.C. in 2005, where it was renamed the Washington Nationals.

A two-game MLB exhibition pre-season series between the Toronto Blue Jays and the New York Mets were played on March 28–29, 2014 at Olympic Stadium in front of sold-out crowds. This proved to be very popular with Montrealers, and the Blue Jays (as the home team) hosted the Cincinnati Reds in 2015, the Boston Red Sox in 2016, the Pittsburgh Pirates in 2017, the St. Louis Cardinals in 2018, and the Milwaukee Brewers in 2019. (On March 23 and 24, 2020 the Blue Jays were scheduled to host the New York Yankees at Olympic Stadium but the two-game series were canceled due to the COVID-19 pandemic.) All six of the two-game series were played in an attempt to gauge the city's interest in a revived Expos franchise. The Board of Trade of Metropolitan Montreal is also actively working on building a new stadium downtown and bringing back a major league baseball team to Montreal.

Basketball

So far, all attempts at establishing a professional basketball team in Montreal have failed. The most recent attempt so far, the Montreal Jazz of the National Basketball League of Canada, lasted for only one season.

However, Montreal has established itself as a popular place for NBA preseason games. On October 22, 2010, the Bell Centre hosted the first pre-season National Basketball Association (NBA) game between the Toronto Raptors and the New York Knicks. This was followed by further games on October 19, 2012, when they faced the New York Knicks, October 20, 2013, when the Boston Celtics played against the Minnesota Timberwolves, October 24, 2014, when the Toronto Raptors played against the New York Knicks, October 23, 2015, when the Toronto Raptors played against the Washington Wizards, October 10, 2018, when the Toronto Raptors played against the Brooklyn Nets, and October 14, 2022, when the Toronto Raptors played against the Boston Celtics. All seven games were held at the Bell Centre and were sold out. They were played in an attempt to gauge the city's interest in a full-time team.

Montreal is considered a possible future location for an NBA team.

Gaelic sports
The Gaelic games of hurling and Gaelic football, governed by the Gaelic Athletic Association, have been played in Montreal since 1948. These sports have become increasingly popular with locals and new Irish immigrants. Beginners are actively encouraged. Games are played against Quebec City, Toronto, Kingston, Ottawa, Halifax, St.Johns etc.. There is also a domestic co-ed Montreal Gaelic Football Superleague open to complete beginners. They are played under the banner of the Montreal Shamrocks GAC. Despite having no home field, Gaelic sports have grown leaps and bounds over the years, many requests have been submitted to the city as the Shamrocks await a permanent home.

Roller derby
Montréal Roller Derby were the first non-U.S. roller derby league to gain membership in the Women's Flat Track Derby Association (WFTDA). The league hosts the annual "Beast of the East" tournament for intraleague (club) roller derby teams from eastern Canada. As of November 30, 2015, their travel team was ranked 15th in WFTDA's East region.

Rugby
Rugby is  sport in expansion on the island. The rugby teams are divided by their language and their division, but over all it is a big family trying to expand a sport misunderstood and unknown by many. Montreal boasts a dozen rugby clubs, including the oldest in North America, Westmount Rugby Club, founded in 1878 and the newest Rugby XV de Montreal created in 2010. Traditionally associated with the Anglo community, rugby has seen a sharp rise in Francophone participation in recent decades. Quebec Caribou, drawing many players from Montreal clubs, represented the province in the Rugby Canada Super League before the league's demise following the 2008 season, and now represents the province in the Rugby Canada National Junior Championship. The province's senior players are also eligible for selection to the Atlantic Rock, a St. John's-based team which represents Canada's five easternmost provinces in the Canadian Rugby Championship.

Recreation

Montreal has a well-developed network of bicycle paths. Bike rentals are available at the Old Port of Montreal, as well as quadricycles, inline skates, children trailers, and Segways. In addition to a network of parks that include le Parc du Mont-Royal, on the mountain's side, Montreal offers five beaches around the island for recreational activities: Cap St. Jacques Nature Park, Bois-de-L’Ile Bizard Nature Park, Jean Drapeau Park Beach, Pointe Calumet Beach Club and Oka Beach. The Quebec Ministry of Environment tests the beaches for pollutants, on a scale from “A” to “D”.

Bandy Quebec seeks to promote bandy in Montreal. There has been an introduction. No teams exist yet.

Sporting events

Montreal is host to three high-profile auto racing events each year: the F1 Canadian Grand Prix, the NAPA Auto Parts 200, a NASCAR Nationwide Series racing event, and the Montreal 200, a Grand Am Rolex Sports Car Series event. The race takes place at the Circuit Gilles Villeneuve on Île Notre-Dame.  Montreal was also the host of the Molson Indy Montreal / Grand Prix of Montreal of the Champcar Series. The races also took place at the Circuit Gilles Villeneuve. Of the 300,000 spectators at the F1 race, 25 percent are from outside of Quebec. The Formula One event is responsible for $84 million in economic benefits and the province will collect more than $9 million in additional tax revenues every year because of the race.

In golf, the Royal Montreal Golf Club on Île Bizard has been an occasional venue for the Canadian Open on the PGA Tour, most recently in 2001. The Montreal Championship, an event on PGA Tour Champions for golfers 50 and older, was launched in 2010 and is hosted by Club de Golf Fontainebleu in the suburb of Blainville.

Montreal has hosted several international soccer tournaments, including some games for the 2007 FIFA U-20 World Cup and the 2015 FIFA Women's World Cup. 

The Canada Masters, currently sponsored as the Rogers Cup, is an annual tennis tournament held in Montreal and Toronto. The men's competition is an ATP Masters Series event on the Association of Tennis Professionals (ATP) tour. The women's competition is a Tier 1 event on the Women's Tennis Association (WTA) tour. The two competitions are currently held in separate weeks in the July–August period. The events alternate from year-to-year between the cities of Montreal and Toronto. In odd-numbered years, the men's tournament is held in Montreal, while the women's tournament is held in Toronto, and vice versa in even-numbered years. The competition is played on hard courts.

Montreal has also hosted multiple professional wrestling events, most notably the WWE Survivor Series on November 9, 1997, where the infamous Montreal Screwjob took place. The WWE’s annual Draft event took place in Montreal in 2019 (called the Superstar Shake-Up at the time), which made Montreal the very first city outside of the United States to host the event.

Multi-sport events

The most important sporting event in Montreal's history was when Montreal played host to the 1976 Summer Olympics.

Montreal hosted the ICF Flatwater Racing World Championships in 1986.

In July 2005 Montreal hosted the 11th FINA World Aquatics Championships.

In 2006, Montreal was expected to attract some 16,000 LGBT athletes, who will participate in the first-ever GLISA World Outgames. The Outgames are being hailed as the largest international event in the city of Montreal since the 1976 Olympics.

Organizations
Ethnosport World Society is based in Montreal.

Sports media

Montreal has one all-sport radio station, the English-language CKGM (TSN 690). Sport is covered daily in the city's newspapers by beat writers in The Montreal Gazette, La Presse, Le Journal de Montréal and Le Devoir. The French-language cable television channel, Réseau des Sports (RDS) focuses much of its coverage on Montreal-based sport clubs and events, however also features standard North American sports programming much like its Toronto-based English-language sister station, The Sports Network (TSN).

Major sports venues

List of sports teams

References